Ekpene Ukpa is a village in Eket local government area of Akwa Ibom State.

The people of Ekpene Ukpa similar to the people of Ikot Ebiyan primarily engage in farming and cultivating of Palm Tree, Yams, Cassava and Palm Wine. They speak Ekid.

References

Villages in Akwa Ibom